The Tamaulipas State Police, also known as the Tamaulipas Force, is a state agency of law enforcement in Tamaulipas, Mexico. It operates public safety services. It is a division of the Secretariat of Public Safety of Tamaulipas.

Police academy 
The state police academy is located in Colonia Benito Juárez in Ciudad Victoria.

Prisons 
The agency operates the state of Tamaulipas's prisons for adults. Each is called a "Centro de Rehabilitacion Social" (CERESO, "Social Rehabilitation Center"). As of 2010 the state has eight prisons with almost 8,000 prisoners. 25% of the prisoners faced federal charges.

The prisons include:
 CERESO Altamira
 CERESO Mante
 CERESO Miguel Alemán
 CERESO Nuevo Laredo II
 CERESO Reynosa
 CERESO Tula
 CERESO Victoria

References

External links

 Tamaulipas Department of Public Safety 
 CNN Wire Staff. "Officials: At least 141 inmates escape from Mexican prison." CNN. December 18, 2010.

Public Safety
State police agencies of Mexico